The year 1831 in architecture involved some significant events.

Buildings and structures

Buildings

 The Bridge of Sighs, St John's College, Cambridge, England, designed by Henry Hutchinson, is completed.
 The Dugald Stewart Monument in Edinburgh, Scotland, designed by W. H. Playfair, is completed.
 The Burns Monument, Edinburgh, is designed by Thomas Hamilton.
 North Church in Aberdeen, Scotland, designed by John Smith, is opened.
 Goodrich Court in Herefordshire, England, designed by Edward Blore, is completed.
 The Pedrocchi Café in Padua, Italy is completed.
 Waterloo Chamber at Windsor Castle in England, designed by Jeffry Wyatville, is constructed.

Publications
 Augustus Charles Pugin publishes Examples of Gothic Architecture in London.

Awards
 Grand Prix de Rome, architecture: Prosper Morey.

Births
 January 12 – Philip Webb, English architect (died 1915)
 May 7 – Richard Norman Shaw, Scottish-born architect (died 1912)
 June 21 – John Henry Chamberlain, English architect (died 1883)

Deaths
 December 8 – James Hoban, Irish architect working in the United States (born 1762)

References 

Architecture
Years in architecture
19th-century architecture